German rapper Fler has released 17 studio albums, four mixtapes, one EP, six collaborative albums and 59 singles.

Albums

Studio albums
<onlyinclude>

Collaborative albums

Compilations

Mixtapes

EPs

Singles

As lead artist

Collaboration singles

As featured performer

Guest appearances 
 2002: Cordon Sport Massenmord auf Aggro Ansage Nr. 1 von Aggro Berlin
 2002: Küche oder Bett auf Berlin bleibt hart von Orgi 69 und Bass Sultan Hengzt
 2002: Heavy Metal Payback und Zukunft (Electroghetto Remix) auf Aggro Ansage Nr. 2 von Aggro Berlin
 2003: Kugelsicher auf Gemein wie 10 (Single) von Bushido
 2003: Vaterland, Mein Revier, Asphalt, Zukunft, Dreckstück und Vom Bordstein bis zur Skyline auf Vom Bordstein bis zur Skyline von Bushido
 2004: Zum Teufel mit den Regeln auf Einblick 3
 2005: Was willst du tun auf Entfachte Macht von VS Mafia
 2005: Jump, Jump (DJ Tomekk kommt) auf Numma Eyns von DJ Tomekk
 2005: Mein Konto auf Das Mixtape von MC Bogy
 2005: Willkommen in Berlin Remix und Abtörn Görl auf Rap City Berlin 
 2005: So fresh so clean auf Heiße Ware von B-Tight & Tony D
 2005: Maxim ist King auf Maxim – Memorial Sampler 
 2005: Geballte deutsche Power auf Geballte Atzen Power von MC Bogy
 2006: Heavy Metal Payback, Zukunft (Electroghetto Remix) und Champion auf Aggro Ansage Nr. 2X von Aggro Berlin
 2006: G-Hot hat es geschafft, A.G.G.R.O Mafia, Ja, Ja, Ja, Ja, Ja und Wer will jetzt Streit auf Aggrogant von G-Hot
 2006: Dumm fickt gut, Down und Goldkettentrend 2 auf Berliner Schnauze von Bass Sultan Hengzt
 2006: Ich kling wie was auf Badboys von MOK
 2006: Ghetto Beat und Identität auf Der neue Standard von Beathoavenz
 2006: Ghettostarz auf Nichts war umsonst von Don Tone
 2006: GZSZ auf Ich von Sido
 2007: Was ich mach auf Auferstanden aus Ruinen von Joe Rilla
 2007: Keiner kann was machen auf Ghetto Romantik von B-Tight
 2007: Ein Fick ist ein Fick auf Dr. Sex von Frauenarzt
 2007: Straßenmukke Remix und Alle für einen auf Hustler von MOK
 2007: Wo sind die Ladies hin auf Ein Level weiter von Greckoe
 2007: Sags ins Gesicht auf Krieg in Berlin von Manny Marc
 2007: Straßenmukke auf Straßenmukke von MOK
 2007: Outro und Ärgermann auf Totalschaden von Tony D
 2007: Spielverderber auf Neger Neger von B-Tight
 2007: Mein Sound, Gangster salutieren, Ein neuer Tag und Wir ändern uns nie auf Wir nehmen auch Euro von DJ Sweap & Pfund 500
 2008: Deutschrap 2008 auf Manisch depressiv von Woroc & Dissput
 2008: Disswut (Remix) auf Anders als du von Dissput
 2008: Unser Leben und Aggrokalypse auf Ich und meine Maske von Sido
 2008: Grau auf Geschichten die das Leben schreibt von Manuellsen
 2008: Die Welt ist nicht genug auf Feiern mit den Pleitegeiern von Frauenarzt & Manny Marc
 2009: Tag ein Tag aus auf Amnezia von Nyze
 2009: Egoist auf Illegal von Automatikk
 2010: Hör mal wer da hämmert auf Artkore von Nazar & Raf Camora
 2010: Airmax auf Beton, Battle on the Rockz und Mit dem BMW auf Zeiten ändern dich von Bushido
 2010: Deine Zeit kommt auf Kenneth allein zu Haus von Kay One
 2010: Wo kommst du her? auf Halbblut von El-Mo
 2010: Homie, SIDM, Cypher, Die Bombe und Maskulin ist im Gebäude auf Weiße Jungs bringens nicht von Reason
 2011: Live aus Berlin und Nur der Mond ist mein Zeuge auf Silla Instinkt von Silla
 2011: Die Welt dreht sich auf Ein Fall für zwei von DJ Sweap und DJ Pfund 500

Free tracks

Notes
 1 "Opfer" means "Victim" in German, it is also an insult in the German slang language; meaning "Loser".

DVDs 
 2006: Trendsetter DVD
 2008: Südberlin Maskulin DVD
 2009: Carlo Cokxxx Nutten 2 DVD
 2010: Berlins Most Wanted DVD
 2011: Airmax Muzik II DVD

Music videos 
 2004: AggroberlinA
 2004: Splitvideo zur Aggro Ansage Nr. 4
 2005: NDW 2005
 2005: Jump Jump (DJ Tomekk kommt)
 2005: Nach Eigenen Regeln
 2006: AggroberlinA 2006
 2006: Papa ist zurück
 2006: Çüs Junge
 2006: Wir bleiben stehen
 2006: Der Chef (Clip & Klar)
 2006: G-Hot hat es geschafft (G-Hot feat. Fler)
 2007: Mein Sound
 2007: Was ist Beef?
 2007: Das ist los!
 2008: Deutscha Bad Boy
 2008: Warum bist Du so?
 2008: Wenn der Beat nicht mehr läuft (Frank White & Godsilla)
 2008: Was los ?!? / Ich bin ein Rapper (Frank White & Godsilla)
 2008: Unsere Zeit (Frank White & Godsilla)
 2008: Splitvideo of Aggro Anti Ansage Nr. 8
 2009: Check mich aus
 2009: Ich sing nicht mehr für Dich (Fler feat. Doreen)
 2009: Gangsta Rapper (Fler feat. Godsilla und Reason)
 2009: Eine Chance / Zu Gangsta (Sonny Black & Frank White)
 2010: SIDM (Reason feat. Fler – exklusiv über Flers YouTube-Kanal veröffentlicht)
 2010: Mit dem BMW / Flersguterjunge (Fler feat. Bushido)
 2010: Das alles ist Deutschland (Fler feat. Bushido)
 2010: Erst Ghetto, dann Promi (Internet-Video)
 2010: Schwer erziehbar 2010
 2010: Berlins Most Wanted (mit Bushido und Kay One)
 2010: Weg eines Kriegers (mit Bushido und Kay One)
 2011: Nie an mich geglaubt
 2011: Minutentakt
 2011: Airmax
 2011: Polosport Massenmord (mit MoTrip)
 2011: Die Welt dreht sich (mit MoTrip und DJ Sweap / DJ Pfund 500)
 2011: Spiegelbild

References 

Discographies of German artists
Hip hop discographies